Shimoji may refer to:

Shimoji (surname), a Japanese surname
Shimoji-shima, an island of Okinawa Prefecture, Japan
Shimoji, Okinawa, a former town in Miyako District, Okinawa Prefecture, Japan
Shimoji Station, a railway station in Toyohashi, Aichi Prefecture, Japan